The Angel of Broadway was a 1927 American silent drama film produced by Cecil B. DeMille and distributed by Pathé Exchange. It was directed by Lois Weber and starred Leatrice Joy. The film is now considered lost.

Cast
 Leatrice Joy - Babe Scott
 Victor Varconi - Jerry Wilson
 May Robson - Big Bertha
 Alice Lake - Goldie
 Elise Bartlett - Gertie
 Ivan Lebedeff - Lonnie
 Jane Keckley - Captain Mary
 Clarence Burton - Herman
 Carmencita Johnson - Baby (uncredited)
 Rosina Lawrence - Dancer (uncredited)

Production
In addition to Weber as director, Harold McLernon was the film's editor, and Mitchell Leisen was production designer. Lenore Coffee wrote the screenplay, based on her own story. Arthur C. Miller was the cinematographer, and William Sistrom was the producer.

References

External links
 
 

1927 films
1927 drama films
Silent American drama films
American silent feature films
American black-and-white films
Films directed by Lois Weber
American independent films
Lost American films
Pathé Exchange films
Lost drama films
1927 lost films
1920s American films